Oleg Felevich Bozhev (born 25 August 1961 in Moscow, Russian SFSR) is a former speed skater. He trained at VSS Trud.

Short biography
Competing for the Soviet Union, Oleg Bozhev had his best year in 1984 when he won a bronze medal on the 1,500 m at the Winter Olympics in Sarajevo, became World Allround Champion ten days later, became Soviet Allround Champion two weeks after that and skated a world record on the 1,500 m another two weeks later. He also was awarded the Order of Friendship of Peoples that year. The following three years (1985-1987), he won silver at the World Allround Championships. The closest he came to winning a second World Allround Championship was in 1986 when he finished second behind Hein Vergeer, with a difference of only 0.014 points, which translates to a mere 0.28 seconds of difference on the final distance (the 10,000 m). Except for one more international appearance in 1992, his last international appearance was in 1988.

Bozhev currently is the senior coach of the Russian skating team.

Medals
An overview of medals won by Bozhev at important championships he participated in, listing the years in which he won each:

Records

World records 
Over the course of his career, Bozhev skated one world record:

Source: SpeedSkatingStats.com

Personal records
To put these personal records in perspective, the WR column lists the official world records on the dates that Bozhev skated his personal records.

Note that Bozhev's personal record on the 3,000 m was not a world record because Leo Visser skated 3:59.27 at the same tournament. Bozhev's personal record on the big combination was not a world record either because Nikolay Gulyayev skated 159.356 at the same tournament.

Bozhev has an Adelskalender score of 159.611 points. His highest ranking on the Adelskalender was a third place.

References 

 Oleg Bozjev at SpeedSkatingStats.com
 Personal records from Jakub Majerski's Speedskating Database
 Evert Stenlund's Adelskalender pages
 Short biography of Oleg Bozhev (in Russian)
 Legends of Soviet Sport: Oleg Bozhev

1961 births
Living people
Russian male speed skaters
Soviet male speed skaters
Olympic speed skaters of the Soviet Union
Speed skaters at the 1984 Winter Olympics
Olympic bronze medalists for the Soviet Union
Speed skaters from Moscow
Olympic medalists in speed skating
World record setters in speed skating
Medalists at the 1984 Winter Olympics
World Allround Speed Skating Championships medalists